Abul-Hasan Kūshyār ibn Labbān ibn Bashahri Daylami (971–1029), also known as Kūshyār Daylami, was an Iranian mathematician, geographer, and astronomer from Daylam, south of the Caspian Sea, Iran.

Career 
Kūshyār Daylami's main work was probably done about the beginning of the 11th century, and seems to have taken an important part in the elaboration of trigonometry. He continued the investigations of the 10th century mathematician and astronomer Abul Wáfa, and devoted much space to this in his  (book of astronomical tables)  ("The Comprehensive and Mature Tables"), which incorporated the improved values of the planetary apogees observed by al-Battani. The tables were translated into the Persian language before the end of the century. He wrote also an astrological introduction and an arithmetic treatise  (Principles of Hindu Reckoning, that is extant in both Arabic and Hebrew).

Kūshyār Daylami's pupils included the Persian mathematician Al-Nasawi. Kūshyār Daylami is thought to have died in Baghdad.

References

Further reading
 
 
  (PDF version)

971 births
1029 deaths
10th-century Iranian mathematicians
10th-century Iranian astronomers
11th-century Iranian astronomers
Astronomers of the medieval Islamic world
People from Gilan Province